

Quakemaster

Quiz Kid
Quiz Kid is a fictional character appearing in American comic books published by DC Comics.

In his panel seen within the pages of "The New Golden Age" #1, Raghu Seetharaman is a child prodigy who has earned him the nickname "Quiz Kid". While partaking in a trivial competition, it was interrupted by the evil Spirit King who took everyone there hostage. Mister Terrific showed up where he rescued the hostages and defeated Spirit King. Then he stayed to help decide who would be the winner of the trivial competition. That ended up being Raghu. Impressed by his knowledge, Mister Terrific went up against him in a friendly competition. It lasted for 12 hours before the judges decided to call it a draw. Since that day, Quiz Kid became Mister Terrific's sidekick and helped him in his crimefighting. By 1946, Quiz Kid mysteriously vanished while Mister Terrific was investigating the mysterious disappearance of Betsy Ross and Molly Pitcher which has been unsolved to this day. By the final issue of "Flashpoint Beyond", Quiz Kid was among the thirteen missing Golden Age superheroes in the Time Masters' capsules. When those capsules have failed, they were all pulled back to their own time with history rebuilding around them.

Quiz Kid was among the Lost Children on Childminder's island. He assumed that Stargirl was from the future until the information was cleared up upon the arrival of Corky Baxter of the Time Masters.

Moira Queen
Moira Queen is the mother of Oliver Queen/the Green Arrow. She and her husband Robert were killed by lions during an African safari.

Moira Queen in other media
Moira Queen was portrayed by Susanna Thompson in The CW's Arrow. She was murdered by Slade Wilson, a.k.a. Deathstroke, while her son (Oliver Queen) and his sister Thea watched. In the series finale sometime after the "Crisis on Infinite Earths", history was changed and Moira survived the attack.  She later meets Emiko Adachi at Oliver's funeral.

Robert Queen
Robert Queen is the father of Oliver Queen/the Green Arrow. He and his wife Moira were killed by lions during an African safari.

Robert Queen in other media
 Robert was briefly seen in a flashback in Smallville Season 7, portrayed by Jonathan Scarfe. He and Moria are secretly also involved with the Veritas Society, but were murdered by fellow Veritas member Lionel Luthor.
 Robert Queen was portrayed by Jamey Sheridan in The CW's Arrow. He sacrificed himself and his bodyguard after making it to a life raft with his son (Oliver Queen) and said bodyguard, as there was not enough food or water for all three of them to survive.

Keli Quintela

Qwsp

References

 DC Comics characters: Q, List of